Anshen Buxin Wan is a dark brown or sugar-coated pill used in Traditional Chinese medicine to "calm the spirit and tonify the heart". It acts as a sedative and has adaptogenic properties. It is used to nourish the heart and calm the nerves caused by "yin and blood deficiencies".

Chinese classic herbal formula

The Decoctum Tranquilizici Concentratum is a decoction of Cortex Albiziae (合欢皮), Semen Cuscutae (大豆菟丝子), Herba Ecliptae (旱莲草), Fructus Ligustri Lucidi (女贞子), Caulis Polygoni Multiflori (首乌藤), Radix Rehmanniae (生地黄) and Concha Margaritifera Usta (珍珠母).

See also
 Chinese classic herbal formula
 Bu Zhong Yi Qi Wan
 Chaihu Shugan Wan

References

Traditional Chinese medicine pills